Ferroviário Atlético Clube may refer to the following Brazilian club:
 Ferroviário Atlético Clube (CE), Ceará
 Ferroviário Atlético Clube (RO), Rondônia
 Ferroviário Atlético Clube (AL), Alagoas

See also
 Clube Atlético Ferroviário, Paraná